Lars Henrik Wikström (born 1963) is a Swedish songwriter and music producer. He has entered the Eurovision Song Contest as a composer for Sweden in 2006 with the song "Invincible". The song was performed by Carola Häggkvist and placed 5th in the final.

Henrik is a veteran of the Melodifestivalen competition, the Swedish preselection for the Eurovision Song Contest, having written 34 songs between 1983 and 2017.

Eurovision and Pre-Selection Entries

 Sweden 2006 - ”Invincible” - Carola, 1st place in Melodifestivalen 2006, representing Sweden at Eurovision 2006
 Romania 2008 - ”Shine” - Biondo, 2nd place in Selecția Națională
 Romania 2008 - ”Dr Frankenstein” - LaGaylia Frazier, 10th place in Selecția Națională
 Sweden 2014 - ”Survivor” - Helena Paparizou, 4th place in Melodifestivalen 2014
 Sweden 2014 - ”Burning Alive” - Shirley Clamp
 Sweden 2014 - ”En himmelsk sång” - Ellinore Holmer
 Ukraine 2014 - ”Courageous” - neAngely, 5th place
 Azerbaijan 2016 - ”Miracle” - Samra, representing Azerbaijan at Eurovision 2016
 Sweden 2016 - ”Constellation Prize” - Robin Bengtsson, 5th place in Melodifestivalen 2016

References

Living people
1963 births
Swedish songwriters